Todor Lyubchev Nedelev (born 7 February 1993) is a Bulgarian footballer who plays as a winger or attacking midfielder for Ludogorets Razgrad.

Early life
Nedelev was born on 7 February 1993, and raised in the village of Belozem, Plovdiv Province.

Career

Botev Plovdiv
Nedelev started to play football at his local club before joining the Botev 2002 Academy in 2004. On 27 June 2011, Nedelev signed a professional contract with Botev Plovdiv. He made his first league appearance in Botev's 1–0 away win over Dobrudzha Dobrich on 13 August, coming on as a 70th-minute substitute. A week later he made his first start in a game versus Spartak Varna. On 3 September, Nedelev scored his first goal to secure a 1–1 draw against Chernomorets Pomorie. He finished his first season with 2 goals in 23 matches, as Botev clinched promotion to the A PFG.

On 11 August 2012, Nedelev marked his A PFG debut with a three assists for an Ivan Tsvetkov hat-trick in a 3–0 home win over Slavia Sofia. On 19 December, it was announced that Botev had renewed the contract of Nedelev, extending it until 31 December 2015. He ended his first season in A PFG with 9 goals and 12 assists.

Nedelev scored his first-ever European goals on 11 July 2013, scoring twice in a 5–0 home win over Astana in their first qualifying round-match of Europa League. He then scored two goals in Botev's 2–1 win over Levski Sofia on 21 July, in their opening game of the 2013–14 season in the domestic league.

Mainz 05
On 1 September 2013, Nedelev signed a four-and-a-half-year contract with Mainz 05, joining the team on 1 January 2014. Nedelev made his official league debut on 25 March 2014, in the 1–3 away loss against Eintracht Braunschweig after coming on as a second-half substitute for Julian Koch.

Loan to Botev Plovdiv

2015-16
After only two matches for the first team of Mainz, Nedelev was loaned until the end of season 2015–16. On 23 January 2016, he joined his previous club Botev Plovdiv in search of more playing time. Nedelev made his second debut for the team during 1-0 home win in the local derby match against Lokomotiv Plovdiv.

On 28 February, after almost two years since his last goal, Nedelev scored during the 2-2 draw of Botev Plovdiv with PFC Pirin Blagoevgrad and he was elected for "man of the match". On 16 April, Nedelev scored an injury-time equaliser during the 2-2 draw with PFC Montana. A couple of weeks later, on 29 April, Nedelev scored a goal from a direct free kick against FC Pirin Blagoevgrad. In the last game of the season, on 27 May 2016, Nedelev provided the assists for both goals during the 2-1 home win over the champions from Ludogorets Razgrad.

2016-17

On 9 July 2016, Nedelev's loan was extended until 30 June 2017. On 15 August 2016, Nedelev scored twice for the 3-2 win over Slavia Sofia and was elected for "man of the match". On 27 August, Nedelev provided an assist for the first goal during the 2-1 home victory over PFC Neftochimic Burgas and again received the award for "man of the match". On 1 October, Nedelev was selected for "man of the match" during the 0-0 home draw with CSKA Sofia.

On 16 October 2016, Nedelev scored 2 goals during the tremendous 3-4 away win over Beroe Stara Zagora. Following his excellent performance, he won the award for the best player of 10th round of First Professional Football League (Bulgaria). In the next round, on 22 October, Nedelev made an assist for Radoslav Terziev goal during the 2-3 home defeat from Cherno More Varna.

On 30 October, Nedelev provided a phenomenal assist to João Paulo who scored in the 13th second of the 1-1 draw with Levski Sofia. In November and December 2016, Nedelev scored goals against Slavia Sofia, FC Vereya, and Pirin Blagoevgrad.

Nedelev started 2017 with assists during the 2-0 win over Beroe on 6 March and the 1-1 draw with Cherno More Varna on 11 March. On 31 March, Nedelev scored a penalty during the 2-0 win over PFC Montana. A few days later, on 8 April, Nedelev scored twice and made an assist during the 7-1 win over the same opponent.

On 19 April, Nedelev scored from a penalty kick in the final minute and Botev Plovdiv achieved 0-1 away victory over FC Vereya in the first leg of the semi-finals of the Bulgarian Cup. On 24 Ma,y Botev Plovdiv achieved a tremendous success by winning with 2-1 against Ludogorets Razgrad. Nedelev and his teammates lifted the Bulgarian Cup for the third time in the history of the club.

Permanent return to Botev

2017-18
On 22 June 2017, Nedelev moved to Botev Plovdiv permanently, signing a contract for 3 years with Mainz 05, keeping the right to take half or more from the next transfer fee of the player. On 29 June, Nedelev scored a goal for the 3-1 away win over Partizani Tirana in the 1st qualifying round of UEFA Europa League. On 20 July, he provided assists for two of the goals during the 4-0 win over Beitar Jerusalem in the 2nd qualifying round of UEFA Europa League. On 9 August, Nedelev scored a spectacular goal from a free kick against Ludogorets Razgrad, and a penalty shootout later,  Botev Plovdiv won the Bulgarian Supercup for the first time in its history.

On 13 August, Nedelev scored a goal to secure the 1-1 away draw with Beroe Stara Zagora. He received the award for man of the match. On 10 September, Nedelev was the key player and scored a goal for the spectacular 2-1 win over PFC Levski Sofia. He received again the award for man of the match.

After missing a couple of games due to an injury, on 24 September, Nedelev returned in the starting lineup with an assist and a goal for the 3-0 win in the derby game against Lokomotiv Plovdiv. This game became known as the "silent derby" because due to a ban no supporters were allowed on the stadium. Once again, Nedelev earned the award for "man of the match" thanks to his extraordinary performance. On 27 October, Nedelev scored for 1-2 away win over Pirin Blagoevgrad and was selected for man of the match. On 18 November, Nedelev scored a penalty for the 1-1 away draw against CSKA Sofia. A week later, during his 100th appearance for Botev Plovdiv, Nedelev scored a penalty for the 1-1 away draw against Septemvri Sofia.

On 18 November, Nedelev scored a penalty during the first half of the 1-1 draw with CSKA Sofia. On 12 December, Nedelev scored a goal and provided 3 assists for the 5-0 win over Litex Lovech in the quarter-final of the Bulgarian Cup. On 12 March, the day when Botev Plovdiv celebrated 106 years from its foundation, Nedelev scored a goal for a dramatic 2-4 away win over FC Vereya. Later on during the same month, his goal against Dunav Ruse was voted as the best goal of the round in Parva Liga. On 6 April, Nedelev provided a wonderful assist for Steven Petkov who scored the winning goal for the 1-0 victory over Levski Sofia. On 11 May, Nedelev again made an amazing assist for the winning goal of João Paulo da Silva Araújo and Botev Plovdiv defeated Beroe Stara Zagora with 2-1.

2018-19

On 28 July 2018, Nedelev scored his first goal for the season for the 0-2 away win over Septemvri Sofia. On 3 August, Nedelev scored a penalty for the 2-0 home win over Etar Veliko Tarnovo. He was selected for "man of the match". On 25 August, Nedelev scored from a direct free kick during the 0-2 away win over FC Vitosha Bistritsa. He was again selected for "man of the match".

2019-20

Nedelev received the Instat index award for the best player of season 2019-20 in Parva Liga.

2020-21

During the opening round of Parva Liga, on 9 August 2020, Nedelev scored a goal, provided an assist and was selected the man of the match for the 2-0 home derby win over the local rivals Locomotiv Plovdiv. A week later, on 16 August, Nedevev provided an assist but this was not enough and Botev Plovdiv lost 2-1 the away visit to CSKA Sofia. On 23 August Nedelev scored twice for the dramatic 3-3 draw with Beroe Stara Zagora. He won once again the award for man of the match.

Ludogorets Razgrad
On the 28 February 2023, the last day of the transfer window, Botev accepted the offer from Ludogorets Razgrad and Nedelev officially joined the club for 150 000 euros.

International career
Nedelev earned his first cap for Bulgaria (as a starter) on 15 August 2013 in the 0–2 away loss against Macedonia in a friendly match.

On 9 September 2014, Nedelev came in as a substitute in the 74th minute and made an assist from a corner kick for the winning goal of Ventsislav Hristov in the opening game of UEFA Euro 2016 qualifying Group H against Azerbaijan. Bulgaria achieved 2–1 victory away from home. On 6 October 2016, Nedelev came in as a substitute in the 75th minute during the 4–1 away defeat from the France national football team.

On 31 August 2017, Nedelev came in as a substitute during the historical 3–2 win over the Sweden national football team. On 7 October, Nedelev was in the starting lineup and despite losing with 0-1, he played well during the entire match against France. On 13 October 2018, Nedelev scored his first goal for the national team in a 2–1 home win against Cyprus. He started the attack for the first goal and scored the decisive second goal in a match for the 2018–19 UEFA Nations League.

On 10 June 2022 the bus of the national team crashed while taking the team to the hotel, before the match with Georgia national football team. Nedelev was the only one injured and had suffered a craniocerebral injury, undergoing surgery after that. Thanks to the fast reactions of the Bulgaria team doctor, his injury was brought under control and the player was expected to return in play in 3 to 6 months.

Career statistics

Club

International

International goals
Scores and results list Bulgaria's goal tally first.

Honours
Botev Plovdiv
Bulgarian Cup: 2016–17
Bulgarian Supercup: 2017

Individual
Best Young Player in Bulgaria: 2012–13
Bulgarian Footballer of the Year Third place: 2017, 2018
Best midfielder in the  Bulgarian First League: 2019
Special award "Trifon Ivanov" Lionheart: 2022

References

External links

1993 births
Living people
Footballers from Plovdiv
Bulgarian footballers
Bulgaria under-21 international footballers
Bulgaria youth international footballers
Bulgaria international footballers
Association football midfielders
Botev Plovdiv players
1. FSV Mainz 05 players
PFC Ludogorets Razgrad players
First Professional Football League (Bulgaria) players
Bundesliga players
3. Liga players
Bulgarian expatriate footballers
Expatriate footballers in Germany
Bulgarian expatriate sportspeople in Germany